The 1980 Houston Cougars football team represented the University of Houston during the 1980 NCAA Division I-A football season. The Cougars were led by 19th-year head coach Bill Yeoman and played their home games at the Astrodome in Houston, Texas. The team competed as members of the Southwest Conference, finishing tied for second. Coming off of a Cotton Bowl-winning 1979 season, the Cougars started the year ranked in the top 10, but ended with a disappointing five regular season losses. Houston was invited to the 1980 Garden State Bowl, where they defeated Navy, 35–0.

Schedule

Source:

Roster

References

Houston
Houston Cougars football seasons
Houston Cougars football